The Hundred of Roby is a hundred within the County of Buccleuch in the Mallee region of South Australia.

Parts of the localities of Cooke Plains, Sherlock, Peake, and Yumali also lie within the hundred.

Local government
In 1911 the District Council of Peake was proclaimed and the Hundred of Roby became one of four wards within the new council area. When Peake was amalgamated with the district councils of Coonalpyn Downs and Meningie in 1997 the hundred became part of the much larger Coorong District Council.

References

Roby